Paitoon Nontadee (born August 11, 1987), simply known as Aum is a Thai professional footballer who plays as a winger.

International career

He made his debut for the Thailand national team in May 2010 against South Africa.

International

Honours

Clubs
Muangthong United
 Thai Premier League (1): 2010
 Kor Royal Cup (1): 2010

References

External links

1987 births
Living people
Paitoon Nontadee
Paitoon Nontadee
Association football wingers
Paitoon Nontadee
Paitoon Nontadee
Paitoon Nontadee
Paitoon Nontadee
Paitoon Nontadee
Paitoon Nontadee
Paitoon Nontadee
Paitoon Nontadee